Steck is a surname. Notable people with the surname include:

Anton Steck (born 1965), German violinist and conductor
Bruno Steck (born 1957), French soccer player and manager
Daniel F. Steck (1881–1950), American politician

Elma Steck (1923–2014), American baseball player
Leo John Steck (1898–1950), American Catholic bishop
Michael R. Steck (born 1972), American drag queen also known as Pandora Boxx
Paul Albert Steck (died 1924), French painter
Ueli Steck (1976–2017), Swiss speed mountaineer

See also
Steck (piano), brand name of the Aeolian Piano company
The Ferdinand Steck Maschinenfabrik, Swiss manufacturer of specialist road building and railway equipment
The Steck-Salathé Route (Sentinel Rock), technical climbing route on Sentinel Rock